Tony Njiké (born 29 January 1998) is a French professional footballer who plays as a midfielder for Liga I club FC Argeș Pitești.

Club career
Njiké is a youth product of Bordeaux, having joined their youth academy in 2013. He signed his first professional contract with Ajaccio on 12 February 2020. He made his professional debut with Ajaccio in a 1–0 loss to Châteauroux on 22 August 2020.

On 21 June 2022, Njiké signed a two-year contract with Argeș Pitești in Romania.

International career
Born in France, Njiké is of Cameroonian descent. In 2017, he was called up to represent the Cameroon U20s.

References

External links
 

1998 births
Living people
Footballers from Paris
French footballers
French sportspeople of Cameroonian descent
Association football midfielders
FC Girondins de Bordeaux players
AC Ajaccio players
SO Cholet players
FC Argeș Pitești players
Liga I players
Ligue 2 players
Championnat National players
Championnat National 2 players
Championnat National 3 players
French expatriate footballers
Expatriate footballers in Romania
French expatriate sportspeople in Romania